The Lahontan Dam is a dam situated on the Carson River in the Carson Desert between Carson City, Nevada and Fallon, Nevada in the United States.  Its impoundment is known as the Lahontan Reservoir or Lake Lahontan.  It is currently operated by the Truckee-Carson Irrigation District.

The Lahontan Dam was built by the Bureau of Reclamation as part of the Newlands Project. When it was completed in 1915, it was the largest earth-fill dam in the United States.

The primary purpose of the dam is to impound water for irrigation use.  The site also includes hydroelectric generators with a total capacity of 4,000 kilowatts.

History 
Construction began as part of the Truckee-Carson Project in 1911 and Lahontan City, Nevada, a company town, was built for the workers.  Water distribution for irrigation began in 1916 and in the same year the project was renamed to the Newlands Project.

References 

Dams on the National Register of Historic Places in Nevada
Earth-filled dams
United States Bureau of Reclamation dams
Dams completed in 1915
National Register of Historic Places in Churchill County, Nevada